{{Infobox video game
| title = Helldivers
| image = Helldivers art.jpg
| developer = Arrowhead Game Studios
| publisher = Sony Computer Entertainment
| director = Johan Pilestedt
| designer = 
| artist = 
| programmer = 
| composer = Johan Lindgren
| engine = Bitsquid
| released = Super-Earth Ultimate Edition (PS4)WindowsDecember 7, 2015
| genre = Shoot 'em up
| modes = Single-player, multiplayer
| platforms = PlayStation 4, PlayStation 3, PlayStation Vita, Microsoft Windows
}}Helldivers is a top-down shooter game developed by Arrowhead Game Studios and published by Sony Computer Entertainment. The game was released for the PlayStation 3, PlayStation 4 and PlayStation Vita with cross-play, on March 3, 2015 in North America and on March 4, 2015 in Europe, respectively. A version for Microsoft Windows was also released via Steam on December 7, 2015, making it the first game Sony released on PC. It features both couch and online co-op, up to four players. Helldivers takes inspiration from military science fiction such as Aliens and Starship Troopers. While solo play is possible, it is often beneficial to play cooperatively, as this allows the players distribute the requirements effectively. This comes with its own risks, however,  most notably friendly fire.

Gameplay
In Helldivers, the player needs to coordinate their actions during chaotic combat in order to complete objectives and to avoid friendly-fire casualties. The game pits the player against three different enemy species and tasks them with ensuring the survival of Super Earth. Gameplay takes place on procedurally-generated missions where players must accomplish a series of objectives. At the start of each mission, the player can choose their loadouts and deployment positions, as well as using the game's unique stratagem mechanic to assist additional options to best suit the map or the player's preferred playstyle. For example, the player may choose stratagems that focus on providing additional firepower or mobility, or give themselves supportive abilities like calling in an airstrike on parts of the map. 

The game features a single difficulty option, though the player can then choose a hard or easy planet for their missions. This had changed over the course of development. 

In each mission, the player must fight or sneak through enemy-controlled territory to complete the given objectives, then escape via a dropship. It is possible to fail some of the given objectives without immediately losing. It often benefits the player to avoid direct combat if possible, as the enemy has infinite reinforcements, and there are no in-game rewards for simply killing enemies. 

The game keeps many of the mechanics common to the genre, like Fog of War and a map that shows any enemies the player(s) can currently see. The enemy will patrol their territory, impeding the player's attempt to complete the given objectives. Enemy units that come in contact with the player(s) will try to raise an alarm, which will result in continuous waves of enemy reinforcements for as long as the alarm remains active. The player can prevent an alarm by avoiding enemy patrols if possible, and can cancel one by  defeating all units currently aware of the player or by fleeing the area. 

Once all mission objectives are successfully completed or failed, the player is then required to call in a dropship and escape with all their remaining units. This takes 90 seconds and draws enemy attention to the landing zone, resulting in heavy fighting. 
Entering the dropship completes the mission.

Multiplayer
As with Arrowhead Game Studios's previous title Magicka friendly fire, the ability to harm teammates, is always on, and there is no way to disable the feature. This includes the players' personal weapons as well as other, less direct sources such as  air support and deployed turrets. Supply drops or vehicle deployments can also crush allies. This requires the players to carefully plan their actions during the game's many chaotic combat sequences, or take preventive measures to mitigate these risks, such as upgrading turrets to stop shooting when players units enter the line of fire or choosing weapons that fire over allies.

There are tangible benefits to multiplayer, however, as teammates can help a downed unit recover, as well as provide healing or ammunition. Several heavy weapons come with a backpack that allows a second player to help reload, and 
some resources can be pooled for  the group to access. In online play, it is even possible to allow random players to join a mission in progress, though this feature can be turned off if desired.

Plot
The dystopian universe of Helldivers has mankind ruled by a 'managed democracy', an improvement of contemporary democracy where the outcome of elections are more predictable. The improved democracy has become more than a way of electing a government, it has become a creed by which the brainwashed inhabitants of Super Earth fight for - without fully acknowledging what it means.

Super Earth, the fictional futuristic Earth is beset on all sides by three hostile enemy races (the Bugs, the Cyborgs and the Illuminates) that, according to the government, in one way or another needs to be subdued. And while the Helldivers are a pure combat unit, they are often tasked with retrieving technology, activating oil-pumps or other activity that is deemed important by the government to preserve freedom and the Earth 'way of life'.

Reception

The game received "generally favorable reviews" on all platforms except the PlayStation 3 version, which received "average" reviews, according to the review aggregation website Metacritic. In Japan, where the game was ported for release on March 5, 2015, Famitsu gave it a score of two eights, one seven, and one eight for a total of 31 out of 40.

IGN played the demo version of Helldivers at the 2013 Gamescom, and reviewed the demo positively. Game Informer also gave the demo a positive rating, commenting that it "isn't easy, but this throwback to classic top down shooters is still a good time."

GameSpots reviewer Cameron Woolsey noted that the PlayStation 4 version has "fantastic cooperative action" but "missions and story are lacking." IGN said of the same PS4 version, "Brutal, focused, and mechanically rich, Helldivers is one of the best co-op action experiences you can have."

In a review-based web series Previously Recorded, Rich Evans described the game as "stratem-up":

The game was nominated for "Best Action" and won "Best Handheld Game of the Year" at the 2016 D.I.C.E. Awards held by Academy of Interactive Arts & Sciences.

References

External links

2015 video games
Multiplayer and single-player video games
PlayStation 3 games
PlayStation 4 games
PlayStation 4 Pro enhanced games
PlayStation Network games
PlayStation Vita games
Sony Interactive Entertainment games
Video games about cyborgs
Video games about insects
Video games about extraterrestrial life
Video games developed in Sweden
Video games set on fictional planets
Video games using procedural generation
Video games with cross-platform play
Windows games